Invar, also known generically as FeNi36 (64FeNi in the US), is a nickel–iron alloy notable for its uniquely low coefficient of thermal expansion (CTE or α). The name Invar comes from the word invariable, referring to its relative lack of expansion or contraction with temperature changes.

The discovery of the alloy was made in 1895 by Swiss physicist Charles Édouard Guillaume for which he received the Nobel Prize in Physics in 1920. It enabled improvements in scientific instruments.

Properties 
Like other nickel/iron compositions, Invar is a solid solution; that is, it is a single-phase alloy. In one commercial version it consists of approximately 36% nickel and 64% iron. The invar range was described by Westinghouse scientists in 1961 as "30–45 atom per cent nickel".

Common grades of Invar have a coefficient of thermal expansion (denoted α, and measured between 20 °C and 100 °C) of about 1.2 × 10−6 K−1 (1.2 ppm/°C), while ordinary steels have values of around 11–15 ppm/°C.  Extra-pure grades (<0.1% Co) can readily produce values as low as 0.62–0.65 ppm/°C. Some formulations display negative thermal expansion (NTE) characteristics. Though it displays high dimensional stability over a range of temperatures, it does have a propensity to creep.

Applications 
Invar is used where high dimensional stability is required, such as precision instruments, clocks, seismic creep gauges, television shadow-mask frames, valves in engines and large aerostructure molds.

One of its first applications was in watch balance wheels and pendulum rods for precision regulator clocks.  At the time it was invented the pendulum clock was the world's most precise timekeeper, and the limit to timekeeping accuracy was due to thermal variations in length of clock pendulums.  The Riefler regulator clock developed in 1898 by Clemens Riefler, the first clock to use an Invar pendulum, had an accuracy of 10 milliseconds per day, and served as the primary time standard in naval observatories and for national time services until the 1930s.

In land surveying, when first-order (high-precision) elevation leveling is to be performed, the level staff (leveling rod) used is made of Invar, instead of wood, fiberglass, or other metals. Invar struts were used in some pistons to limit their thermal expansion inside their cylinders. In the manufacture of large composite material structures for aerospace carbon fibre layup molds, Invar is used to facilitate the manufacture of parts to extremely tight tolerances.

In the astronomical field, Invar is used as the structural components that support dimension-sensitive optics of astronomical telescopes. Superior dimensional stability of Invar allows the astronomical telescopes to significantly improve the observation precision and accuracy.

Variations 
There are variations of the original Invar material that have slightly different coefficient of thermal expansion such as:
Inovco, which is Fe–33Ni–4.5Co and has an α of 0.55 ppm/°C (from 20 to 100 °C).
FeNiCo alloys—named Kovar or Dilver P—that have the same expansion behaviour as borosilicate glass, and because of that are used for optical parts in a wide range of temperatures and applications, such as satellites.

Explanation of anomalous properties 
A detailed explanation of Invar's anomalously low CTE has proven elusive for physicists.

All the iron-rich face-centered cubic Fe–Ni alloys show Invar anomalies in their measured thermal and magnetic properties that evolve continuously in intensity with varying alloy composition. Scientists had once proposed that Invar's behavior was a direct consequence of a high-magnetic-moment to low-magnetic-moment transition occurring in the face centered cubic Fe–Ni series (and that gives rise to the mineral antitaenite); however, this theory was proven incorrect. Instead, it appears that the low-moment/high-moment transition is preceded by a high-magnetic-moment frustrated ferromagnetic state in which the Fe–Fe magnetic exchange bonds have a large magneto-volume effect of the right sign and magnitude to create the observed thermal expansion anomaly.

It was shown that all individual FM and SFCs have positive thermal expansion, and the negative thermal expansion originates from the increasing populations of SFCs with smaller volumes than that of FM.

See also
 Constantan and Manganin, alloys with relatively constant electrical resistivity
 Elinvar, alloy with relatively constant elasticity over a range of temperatures
 Sitall and Zerodur, ceramic materials with a relatively low thermal expansion
 Borosilicate glass and Ultra low expansion glass, low expansion glasses resistant to thermal shock

References

Ferrous alloys
Nickel alloys
Surveying instruments
Low thermal expansion materials